Jennings County High School is a public high school located in North Vernon, Indiana.

Demographics
The demographic breakdown of the 1,423 students enrolled in 2014-15 was:
Male - 50.2%
Female - 49.8%
Native American/Alaskan - 0.4%
Asian - 0%
Native Hawaiian/Pacific Islander - 0%
Black - 0.8%
Hispanic - 3.3%
White - 93.4%
Multiracial - 2.1%

49.4% of the students were eligible for free or reduced lunch.

Athletics

The Jennings County Panthers are members of the Hoosier Hills Conference.  The school colors are red, white and blue.  The following IHSAA sanctioned sports are available:

Baseball (boys')
Basketball (boys' and girls')
Cross country (boys' and girls')
Football (boys')
Golf (boys' and girls'
Soccer (boys' and girls')
Softball (girls')
Swimming (boys' and girls')
Tennis (boys' and girls')
Track (boys' and girls')
Volleyball (girls')
Wrestling (boys')

Notable alumni
 Scott Earl - Former MLB player for the Detroit Tigers.

See also
 List of high schools in Indiana

References

External links
 Official website

Public high schools in Indiana
Education in Jennings County, Indiana